North Chevy Chase is a village in Montgomery County, Maryland, United States. It was established as a Special Tax District in 1924 and incorporated as a village in 1996. The population was 519 at the 2010 census.

The town is part of a larger community, colloquially referred to as Chevy Chase, that includes several adjoining settlements in Montgomery County and one neighborhood of Washington, D.C.

Geography
North Chevy Chase is located at  (39.001709, -77.073908).

North Chevy Chase lies immediately south of the Capital Beltway (I-495), just to the east of the interchange with Connecticut Avenue (MD 185). The village is bisected by Kensington Parkway which runs parallel to Connecticut Avenue.

History
North Chevy Chase lies on the site of Clean Drinking plantation, a much larger colonial land grant visited by George Washington as reported in his diary.

Residential development of the area began in the early 20th century when William H. Walker laid out a community and began selling lots.

In 1924, residents incorporated as a special tax district, and it was officially incorporated as a village until 1996.

Demographics

2010 census
As of the census of 2010, there were 519 people, 189 households, and 144 families living in the village. The racial makeup of the village was 83.8% White, 7.7% African American, 5.4% Asian, 0.8% from other races, and 2.3% from two or more races. Hispanic or Latino of any race were 4.6% of the population.

There were 189 households, of which 37.0% had children under the age of 18 living with them, 69.3% were married couples living together, 5.8% had a female householder with no husband present, 1.1% had a male householder with no wife present, and 23.8% were non-families. 18.5% of all households were made up of individuals, and 9.6% had someone living alone who was 65 years of age or older. The average household size was 2.75 and the average family size was 3.17.

The median age in the village was 45.2 years. 27% of residents were under the age of 18; 5.7% were between the ages of 18 and 24; 17% were from 25 to 44; 35.9% were from 45 to 64; and 14.5% were 65 years of age or older. The gender makeup of the village was 46.1% male and 53.9% female.

2000 census
As of the census of 2000, there were 465 people, 173 households, and 126 families living in the village. The racial makeup of the village was 92.47% White, 4.52% African American, 0.22% Native American, 0.86% Asian, 0.22% from other races, and 1.72% from two or more races. Hispanic or Latino of any race were 1.94% of the population.

There were 173 households, out of which 37.0% had children under the age of 18 living with them, 59.0% were married couples living together, 11.0% had a female householder with no husband present, and 26.6% were non-families. 20.8% of all households were made up of individuals, and 9.8% had someone living alone who was 65 years of age or older. The average household size was 2.69 and the average family size was 3.11.

In the village, the population was spread out, with 27.1% under the age of 18, 3.9% from 18 to 24, 24.3% from 25 to 44, 28.2% from 45 to 64, and 16.6% who were 65 years of age or older. The median age was 42 years. For every 100 females, there were 90.6 males. For every 100 females age 18 and over, there were 90.4 males.

The median income for a household in the village was $103,196, and the median income for a family was $106,942. Males had a median income of $72,292 versus $39,583 for females. The per capita income for the village was $43,499. About 1.7% of families and 2.3% of the population were below the poverty line, including 1.5% of those under age 18 and none of those age 65 or over.

Education
North Chevy Chase is a part of the Montgomery County Public Schools. Zoned schools include Rosemary Hills Elementary School (PreK-2), North Chevy Chase Elementary School (3-6), Westland Middle School, (6-8) and Bethesda-Chevy Chase High School.

North Chevy Chase Elementary School is a magnet elementary school. It opened in 1953 as a community school. After closing in the early 1970s the school reopened in 1972, after the formation of Rosemary Hills Primary School, to serve as a magnet for grades 3–6.

Transportation

No state highways directly serve North Chevy Chase. The most significant road serving the town is Kensington Parkway. However, just outside the town limits, Maryland Route 185 (Connecticut Avenue) has an interchange with Interstate 495 (the Capital Beltway), providing easy road access to much of the region.

Government
The village is governed by a citizens committee of five members, including a chairman.

References

External links

 

Chevy Chase, Maryland
1924 establishments in Maryland
1996 establishments in Maryland
Populated places established in 1924
Populated places established in 1996
Villages in Maryland
Villages in Montgomery County, Maryland